Warehoused is a 2015 Mexican comedy film based on a novel by David Desola.

References

External links 

2015 films
2015 comedy films
Mexican comedy films
2010s Spanish-language films
2010s Mexican films